¡

William Robert Johnson (born 25 September 1999) is a professional footballer who plays as a goalkeeper for Braintree Town.

Having begun his career at local club Beccles Town, Johnson joined Norwich City's under-23 set-up in August 2018 following a successful trial. He remained at Norwich for two years, spending time on loan at Braintree Town of the National League South during the 2019–20 season. Johnson signed for Stevenage in July 2020 and spent one season with the club.

Career

Norwich City
Johnson spent the majority of his youth career at Beccles Town, progressing through the various age groups for his local club. He later joined the Community Sports Foundation's Football and Education Programme in Norwich, which allows young footballers to continue their academic studies alongside a full-time football training programme. The programme was delivered by former Norwich City footballers Adam Drury, Ryan Jarvis and Simon Lappin. Towards the end of the 2017–18 season, Johnson went on trial with Peterborough United. He was offered the opportunity to train with Norwich City during pre-season ahead of the 2018–19 season, with a view to earning a full-time contract. Although Johnson was injured early-on during the trial, he was offered a one-year contract, with the option of a further year, which he signed on 6 August 2018.

Upon signing for Norwich, he was placed in the club's under-23 team to continue his development. Norwich took up the option of extending Johnson's contract for a further year in 2019. He played three times for the under-23 team during the first half of the 2019–20 season, which included two appearances in the EFL Trophy. Johnson joined National League South club Braintree Town on loan for the remainder of the 2019–20 season, making 10 appearances during the loan agreement. His contract at Norwich expired in June 2020.

Stevenage
Johnson signed for League Two club Stevenage on 22 July 2020. He made his professional debut in the club's 3–2 defeat to Milton Keynes Dons at Broadhall Way in the EFL Trophy on 6 October 2020. He was released by Stevenage at the end of the 2020–21 season.

Braintree Town
Ahead of the 2021–22 campaign, following his release from Stevenage, Johnson returned to Braintree Town on a permanent basis.

Career statistics

References

External links

1999 births
Living people
English footballers
Association football goalkeepers
Braintree Town F.C. players
Stevenage F.C. players
English Football League players